Choe Hyon-u (born 8 November 1983) is a North Korean former footballer. He represented North Korea on at least four occasions in 2003, scoring once.

Career statistics

International

International goals
Scores and results list North Korea's goal tally first, score column indicates score after each North Korea goal.

References

1983 births
Living people
North Korean footballers
North Korea international footballers
Association football defenders